Broomhouse is a district of Edinburgh, Scotland. Although on the lands of Old Saughton, its name is adopted from an estate which lay to the north of the Edinburgh and Glasgow Railway. The earliest recorded versions of the name (c.1600) were variations on Brum(e)hous. It mainly comprises a low-rise council housing estate built between 1947 and 1950. It borders on Parkhead, Sighthill, and Saughton Mains. The arterial route of Calder Road (A71) passes to the south.

Transport

Parallel to Broomhouse Drive was  Scotland's first guided busway, West Edinburgh Busway, opened in 2004. The around one-mile section of two-lane busway was, at the time, the longest section of continuous bus guideway in the UK. Subsequently, it has been converted as part of the Edinburgh Trams route with Saughton tram stop at the eastern end of Broomhouse Drive.

The Glasgow railway passes to the north, but there is no railway station.

Amenities

There were two schools (one Roman Catholic the other non-denominational), now merged.  a community centre, two Church congregations (St. Joseph's R.C and St David's Broomhouse C.o.S.) and a counselling centre here. Medical facilities are in nearby Sighthill and Corstorphine.

Saughton House is a large Government building, built in the 1950s, fronting on Broomhouse Drive and houses the Scottish Executive, HM Revenue & Customs, Driver & Vehicle Licensing Agency and a number of other government offices.

The Broomhouse Centre (now Space at The Broomhouse Hub), has served the community since 1990 and a new Community Hub building was opened in 2019 at a cost of £3.2m. The Hub provides a range of activities and support for the local community as well as a Community Café.

References

External links
 St. David's website
 The BIG Project
 St. Joseph's R.C. Church website
 Sighthill, Broomhouse and Parkhead Community Council
 Space at The Broomhouse Hub

Areas of Edinburgh
Housing estates in Edinburgh